Palmeirina is a city located in the state of Pernambuco, Brazil. Located  at 252 km from Recife, capital of the state of Pernambuco, Palmeirina has an estimated (IBGE 2020) population of 7,600 inhabitants.

Geography
 State - Pernambuco
 Region - Agreste Pernambucano
 Boundaries - São João and Angelim   (N);  Correntes and Alagoas state   (S);  Canhotinho  (E);   Garanhuns    (W).
 Area - 158.01 km2
 Elevation - 531 m
 Hydrography - Mundaú River
 Vegetation - Subperenifólia forest
 Climate - Hot and humid
 Annual average temperature - 22.7 c
 Distance to Recife - 252 km

Economy
The main economic activities in Palmeirina are based in commerce and agribusiness, especially beans, bananas; and livestock such as cattle, sheep and poultry.

Economic indicators

Economy by Sector
2006

Health indicators

References

Municipalities in Pernambuco